Small Steps, Heavy Hooves is the debut album by Dear and the Headlights. The album was released on February 6, 2007 on Equal Vision Records.

Track listing 

"Oh No!" - 4:14
"Sweet Talk" - 2:56
"Hallelujah" - 4:09
"Happy In Love" - 3:45
"I'm Bored, You're Amorous" - 4:00
"Grace" - 4:05
"It's Gettin' Easy" - 3:32
"Paper Bag" - 3:53
"Skinned Knees and Gapped Teeth" - 3:35
"Run in the Front" - 4:22
"Mother Make Me Golden" - 4:12
"I Just Do" - 3:43
"Midwestern Dirt" - 6:46

Bonus track available with album purchase on iTunes:

"Telemarket Mishap" - 4:31

References 

2007 debut albums
Dear and the Headlights albums